The Cremona elephant was a gift presented to Holy Roman Emperor Frederick II by Sultan of Egypt Al-Kamil, in 1229. Frederick used the elephant in his triumph parades.

The elephant is mentioned in the context of the visit of  Frederick's brother-in-law Richard of Cornwall to Cremona in 1241, in the Chronica Maiora of Matthew Paris. The presence of the animal is also recorded in the Cremona city annals, in 1237.
  
This elephant was the first of its species reported from first-hand experience by European sources since the days of Abul Abbas owned by Charlemagne. Another 13th-century individual was owned by Louis IX (attested for 1255).

See also
History of elephants in Europe
List of individual elephants

References
 William S. Heckscher: Bernini's Elephant and Obelisk. In: Art Bulletin 29, 1949; S. 155–182
 Stephan Oettermann: Die Schaulust am Elefanten. Eine Elephantographia Curiosa. Syndikat, Frankfurt am Main 1982 S. 99  

Individual elephants
Animals as diplomatic gifts
Frederick II, Holy Roman Emperor